El Nido Airport , also known as Lio Airport, is an airport serving the general area of El Nido, located in the province of Palawan in the Philippines. This concrete airstrip is owned and operated by AirSWIFT. The gravel runway is now partially coated and used as a taxiway for aircraft.

Airlines and destinations

References

External links
 

Airports in the Philippines
Buildings and structures in Palawan